Three ships were of the Royal Mail Line were named RMS Magdalena.

 , an ocean liner used as a troopship during the Crimean War
 , an ocean liner in service 1889–1921
 , a cargo liner that was wrecked on her maiden voyage in 1949.

See also

 , a number of ships with this name

Ship names